Thomas Sheafe D.D. (d. 12 December 1639) was a Canon of Windsor from 1614 to 1639.

Family

He was the son of Thomas Sheafe, clothier of Cranbook in Kent.
He married firstly to Mary Wilson, by whom at least, his daughter Dorothy who married the minister, Henry Whitfield.

His son, Revd Thomas Sheafe MD FRCP, was Gulstonian lecturer in 1641, of Binfield, Berkshire.

Career

He was King's Scholar at Eton College and then educated at King's College, Cambridge where he graduated BA in 1585, MA in 1588 BD in 1595 and DD in 1606.

He was appointed:
Rector of Welford and Withambrook, Berkshire 1597

He was appointed to the ninth stall in St George's Chapel, Windsor Castle in 1614, a position he held until 1639.

Publications
Vindiciae Senectutis, or a Plea for Old Age. Published in London 1639.

Notes 

1639 deaths
Canons of Windsor
People educated at Eton College
Alumni of King's College, Cambridge
Year of birth missing